The Motagua River is a  river in Guatemala. It rises in the western highlands of Guatemala where it is also called Río Grande, and runs in an easterly direction to the Gulf of Honduras. The final few kilometres of the river form part of the Guatemala–Honduras border.

The Motagua River is believed to be the number one most plastic-emitting river in the world, contributing around two per cent of global plastic pollution emissions into the world's oceans annually.

Overview
The river runs in a valley that has the only known source of jadeitite (jade) in Mesoamerica, and was an important commerce route during the Pre-Columbian era. The important Maya site of Quirigua is near the river's north bank, as are several smaller sites with jade quarries and workshops.

The Motagua river valley also marks the Motagua Fault, the tectonic boundary between the North American and the Caribbean Plates. The Motagua fault has been the source of several major earthquakes in Guatemala.

"World’s most polluted river"
Much like Lake Amatitlán, the river is highly polluted with untreated sewage, industrial waste, tons of sediment (garbage) and blackwater from Guatemala City.   It is "considered the world’s most polluted river" and accounts for about 2 percent of the total emissions of plastic into the world’s oceans.   As such, The Ocean Cleanup chose it as the test site for its experimental "Interceptor Trashfence," which attempts to filter out solid pollutants as they flow downriver.

Tributaries

Left
Río Cocoyá, Río Cotón, Río Suchicul, Río Morazán, Río Comajá, Río Lato, Río Huijo, Río La Palmilla, Río Teculutan, Río Pasabien, Río Hondo, Río Jones, RíoLos Achiotes, Río Mayuelas, Río El Lobo, Quebrada Agua Fría, Quebrada La Vegega, Río Las Conchas

Right
Río Chipaca, Rio Agua Escondida, Rio Quisaya, Rio Pixcayá, Río Cotzibal, Río Las Vacas, Río Grande, Río Ovejas, Río El Tambor, Río San Vicente, Río Grande o Zapaca, Río Carí, Río Las Naranjas, Río Biafra, Río El Islote, Río Jubuco, Río Lagarto, Río Tepemechín, Río Juyamá, Río Bobos, Río Animas, Río Chiquito, Río Nuevo o Cacao

References

External links

Map of Guatemala including the river
Jade sources in The Motagua River Valley

Rivers of Guatemala
Rivers of Honduras
Geography of Mesoamerica
International rivers of North America
Guatemala–Honduras border
Border rivers